Binswanger is a surname. Notable people with the surname include:

Harry Binswanger (born 1944), American philosopher
Ludwig Binswanger (1881–1966), Swiss psychologist, nephew of Otto Binswanger, important in existential psychology
Otto Ludwig Binswanger (1852–1929), Swiss neurologist and psychiatrist, uncle of Ludwig Binswanger
Otto Saly Binswanger (1854–1917), German-American chemist and toxicologist, cousin of Otto Ludwig Binswanger

See also
Binswanger's disease (subcortical leukoencephalopathy), in neurology, a form of multi-infarct dementia first described in 1894 by Otto Binswanger